Aakre is a surname. Notable people with the surname include:

 Abraham Aakre (1874–1948), Norwegian politician
 Bodil Aakre (1922–2008), Norwegian politician

References 

Surnames of Norwegian origin